Holly Page (born August 13, 1993) is an American middle-distance and long-distance runner. While attending the University of Wyoming, Page was a two-time NCAA Division 1 All-Mountain Region cross country and Track and field runner.

Bishop Moore High School
Page was an eight-time state finalist in cross country and Track and field in Florida High School Athletic Association 2A.

University of Wyoming
Page placed 1st all-time in University of Wyoming 10,000 metres history, 2nd in 5000 metres history and 9th in 1500 metres outdoor history. Page placed 1st all-time in University of Wyoming  indoor 5000 metres and 3000 metres.

International
Page qualified to represent the United States. She competed in Athletics at the 2015 Summer Universiade – Women's 5000 metres where she placed 12th.

Reference list

External links
 Holly Page High School Results
 Holly Page Athletics profile

1993 births
Living people
American female middle-distance runners
Sportspeople from Orlando, Florida
American female long-distance runners
University of Wyoming alumni
Wyoming Cowboys and Cowgirls track and field
21st-century American women